Greatest Hits 1994–2004 is the second compilation album by Australian singer Tina Arena, released by Columbia Records in Australia on 25 October 2004. It is a greatest hits album that contains all the singles released during her ten years signed with Columbia and also features two new songs. A limited edition was released with a second disc containing her non-English language singles. This compilation album was also released in DVD format and featured all of the music videos she did with Sony plus music videos for several of Arena's French hits. The DVD had the same cover as this audio release. Arena states that all the songs on the album are deeply personal and represent different periods and experiences of her life. Greatest Hits 1994–2004 debuted in the top ten on the Australian ARIA Albums Chart making the album Arena's fourth top ten album. The album only produced one single, "Italian Love Song", which failed to make a major impact on the Australian ARIA Singles Chart just managing a peak within the top forty.

As a singer-songwriter, Arena felt she had worked "really hard to try to tell a story and hope that people identify with it in some way, whether they do when they listen to it for the first time or five years later. It's like passing something on and that's always been my philosophy." Arena states that the album cover feels really rich to her and timeless. She also states "I wanted to go with something interesting, not just a photo, and I wanted it to look iconic. I thought the idea of a watercolour painting was also kind of symbolic because it's got some detail but it's kind of... unfinished."

Track listing

Charts and certifications

Weekly charts

Certifications

Certification (DVD)

References

2004 greatest hits albums
Tina Arena compilation albums
Columbia Records compilation albums